Vishtasp Kairshasp Choksy (born 22 December 1969) (known as V.K Choksy)  is a Sri Lankan Lawyer and advisor. He is a Civil Lawyer and appointed President's Counsel. Choksy belongs to an influential family and is the son of politician and lawyer K. N. Choksy P.C. His expertise in resolving legal disputes and issues for government organisations as well as private clients are remarkable. Choksy was one of the active members and contributed the best of his knowledge in the constitutional challenge to the dissolution of Parliament in 2018.
 
He is also chairman of National Institute of Business Management (Sri Lanka) and director at NSBM. He is a Member of the National Intellectual Property Commission, and Legal Advisor to Mahapola Higher Education Scholarship Trust Fund. A member of the Finance Ministry Compensation Tribunal, A Trustee of the Pragna Bandu Trust Fund & a Member of the Political Vicitimasation Committee. He is also a Director of the Road Development Authority (R.D.A..)He had led several notable cases at state and federal courts. Choksy has been widely recognized for his involvement in the supreme court cases and was appointed as the President's Counsel under the Article 33 of the Constitution of Sri Lanka.
 
Choksy has held positions at a companies including Golden Key Credit Card, Abans Finance PLC, Advantage Ltd and NIBM. In 1993 he won the Merit Prize for Professional Ethics and Accountancy.

Early life and education
 
Choksy was born in Colombo on 22 December 1969. Choksy's father was a member of the Parliament of Sri Lanka and Cabinet Minister of Finance under Prime Minister Ranil Wickremasinghe. He grew up with two siblings.

Choksy completed his primary education from S. Thomas' Preparatory School, and then enrolled in the Colombo International School. As a teenager, Choksy decided to pursue law. He studied at Sri Lanka Law College.

Career
He started his career as a lawyer right after completing graduation from law school. He apprenticed with Romesh De Silva P.C. and started working with him after finishing college. Since 1993, Choksy has been practicing law, with a specialty in Civil Law.

Awards
Choksy is the recipient of The Merit Prize for Professional Ethics and Accountancy, 1993 and Mahapola Award Scholarship at the Sri Lanka Law College Entrance Examination. Over 25 years has had an active participation in The District Courts, Commercial High Courts, Civil Appellate High Courts, Court of Appeal and Supreme Court. He specializes in handling commercial cases and has worked for a number of corporate clients.

Family
Choksy is married to Sirini Ratnayake, a Lawyer. The couple has three children, two daughters and one son. Choksy speaks fluent English and Sinhala. He is a Zoroastrian Parsee from ancient Persian descent.

References

1969 births
Living people
Sri Lankan people of Parsi descent
Sri Lankan Zoroastrians
Alumni of S. Thomas' Preparatory School, Kollupitiya
Alumni of Colombo International School
20th-century Sri Lankan lawyers
President's Counsels (Sri Lanka)
21st-century Sri Lankan lawyers